Keriya (also known as Dwarkanathpura) is a patwar circle and village in ILRC Nimera in Phagi Tehsil in Jaipur district, Rajasthan. Keriya is also a patwar circle for nearby villages, Kanwarpura, Gokulpura and Madanpura.

In Keriya, there are 68 households with total population of 536 (with 52.8% males and 47.2% females), based on 2011 census. Total area of village is 5.59 km2. There is one primary school in Keriya village.

References 

Villages in Jaipur district